Āzar Kayvān was the Zoroastrian high priest of Estakhr and a gnostic philosopher, who was a native of Fars in Iran and later emigrated to Patna in Mughal India during the reign of the Emperor Akbar.

Biography 
Details regarding Azar Kayvan's life are scant and are mainly derived from the hagiographical literature of the Abadi sect. This hagiography places Azar Kayvan, son of Azar Gashasb, and his ancestry back to Sasan V then through Sasan I to the Kayanids, Gayomart, and finally to Mahabad, the figure who appeared at the very beginning of the great cycle of prophecy, according to the Bible of the Prophets of Ancient Iran, and who seems to be none other than the primordial Adam. His mother was named Shirin; her ancestry goes back to Khosrau I Anushiravan, the Philosopher King.

According to the Dabestan-i-Mazahib, as a young boy Azar Kayvan showed signs of his calling to the contemplative life. Through dreams and visions he received the teaching of the ancient sages of Iran, which allowed him to give extraordinary replies to questions which were asked of him at the madrasa where he was a student, and which won him the nickname  (master of the sciences). Internal references in the biography by his devotees allow us to determine that his residence was at Estakhr (about a hundred kilometers north  of Shiraz), where he spent the first thirty or forty years of his life in contemplation and where he assembled his first assembly of disciples. Around 1570, drawn by the religious revival which was taking place in India around the Emperor Akbar, he left with them to settle down in the town of Patna in Bihar, where he lived until he died at around eighty-five years of age.

Students and influence 
Amongst his students, certain of these hagiographical sources place key Shi'ite Muslim theosophical figures of the Safavid philosophical revival at Isfahan within his circle. Notably among these figures was Shaykh Baha'addin Amili and Mir Fendereski, on whose behest the latter seems to have translated a major Tantric yogic text from Sanskrit into Persian.

Azar Keyvan had tendency towards the philosophical school of Sohrevardi, another Persian philosopher of 12th century. He was regarded by his followers to be the reviver of hekmat-e eshrāq (Illuminationist Philosophy) within the context of Zoroastrianism.

According to one school of thought, Dastur Meherji Rana, who had influenced Akbar and founded the famous lineage of Parsi high priests at Navsari, was a disciple of  Azar Kayvan.

See also
 Dabestan-e Mazaheb, whose author was a son of Azar Kayvan according to some scholars.

Notes

References

Works cited

External links
 Dabestan-i-Mazahib or School of Religious Doctrines
  ĀẔAR KAYVĀN H. Corbin, Encyclopædia Iranica

16th-century births
17th-century deaths
Zoroastrian priests
16th-century Iranian philosophers
Iranian Zoroastrians
17th-century Iranian philosophers
Zoroastrian mysticism
Zoroastrian astrologers
Iranian religious leaders
Neo-Zoroastrianism
Iranian emigrants to the Mughal Empire
Mughal Empire people
Iranian emigrants to India